East Portal is an unincorporated community in Mineral County, in the U.S. state of Montana.

History
East Portal was named from the fact the town site was located near the eastern portal of a railroad tunnel.

References

Unincorporated communities in Mineral County, Montana
Unincorporated communities in Montana